Donal Ian Brice Smith (born 4 February 1934) is a former New Zealand middle-distance runner.

Education
Smith was educated at Auckland Grammar School and at the University of Auckland, taking a BA in 1954 and an MA the following year. In 1956 he matriculated at Merton College, Oxford, spending the next four years studying for his DPhil.

Athletic career
In 1958 Smith finished fifth in the 880 yards at the British Empire and Commonwealth Games in Cardiff.

At the 1960 Summer Olympics he was eliminated in the quarter-final of the 800 metres.

Personal life
In 1959 Smith married Marjory Jill Evans.

External links 
 Profile at trackfield.brinkster.net
 Profile at Sports-Reference.com

References

New Zealand male middle-distance runners
Olympic athletes of New Zealand
Athletes (track and field) at the 1960 Summer Olympics
Commonwealth Games competitors for New Zealand
Athletes (track and field) at the 1958 British Empire and Commonwealth Games
1934 births
Living people